Georgios Saridakis (born 1885, date of death unknown) was a Greek athlete who competed mainly in the 3000 metre walk.

He competed for a Greece in the 1906 Intercalated Games held in Athens, Greece in the 3000 metre walk where he won the bronze medal.

References 
 List of Greek athletes

1885 births
Year of death missing
Greek male racewalkers
Olympic athletes of Greece
Olympic bronze medalists for Greece
Medalists at the 1906 Intercalated Games
Athletes (track and field) at the 1906 Intercalated Games
Sportspeople from İzmir
Smyrniote Greeks